Post-amendment to the Tamil Nadu Entertainment Tax Act 1939 on 27 September 2011, Gross jumped to 130 per cent of Nett for films with non-Tamil titles and U certificates as well. Commercial Taxes Department disclosed 70.44 crore in entertainment tax revenue for the year.

A list of Tamil language films produced in the Tamil cinema in India that have been or are to be released in 2012.

Released films

January–June

July – December

Dubbed films

Awards

Notable deaths

References

External links

2012
2012 in Indian cinema
Tamil
2010s Tamil-language films